Pouteria macahensis is a species of plant in the family Sapotaceae. The tree is endemic to the Atlantic Forest ecoregion in southeastern Brazil. It is threatened by habitat loss.

References

macahensis
Endemic flora of Brazil
Flora of the Atlantic Forest
Trees of Brazil
Endangered plants
Endangered biota of South America
Taxonomy articles created by Polbot